All the Pretty Boys is the first album from Melbourne-based singer-songwriter Sophie Koh.

The album is notable as it was produced by Aria Award winning producer Richard Pleasance and contains some of the final recordings of former Crowded House drummer Paul Hester.
The first single from the album Anywhere was given significant airplay on radio station triple j and ABC TV's Rage.  The song was also featured on Video Hits.
Immediately after the release of this album, Sophie Koh and band left The Go-Betweens as their support acts for their final ever Australian tour.

Track listing
"All the Pretty Boys"
"Anywhere"
"Feel the Chorus"
"Silly Thing"
"Fall into Space"
"I See Mama"
"Easily Broken"
"Here's Something Else"
"Timor Song"
"Boat People"
"Silently Sleeping"

Personnel
Sophie Koh – vocals, acoustic guitar, harmonica, piano, keys, viola, accordion
Richard Pleasance – guitars, bass, double bass, keys, effects, some drums, backing vocals, and everything else.
Paul Hester – drums
Tim Reid – Acoustic Guitar
Lukas Bendel – drums
Nicky Bomba – drums

2005 debut albums
Sophie Koh albums